Pascale Bordes (born 18 October 1961) is a French lawyer and politician who has represented the 3rd constituency of the Gard department in the National Assembly since 2022. She is a member of the National Rally (RN).

Bordes is a graduate in criminal law from the University of Montpellier. She joined the bar of Nîmes in 1986 before returning to her native town of Bagnols-sur-Cèze in 2004. In 2020, she was elected a municipal councillor of Bagnols-sur-Cèze on the National Rally list.

She was elected the deputy for Gard's 3rd constituency in the 2022 legislative election under the banner of the National Rally, with 51.3% of the second-round vote, thus defeating outgoing MP Anthony Cellier of La République En Marche! (LREM).

References

1961 births
Living people
National Rally (France) politicians
Deputies of the 16th National Assembly of the French Fifth Republic
French women lawyers
Women members of the National Assembly (France)
20th-century French lawyers
21st-century French lawyers